Harlem Jazz, 1930 is a compilation album of phonograph records assembled by Brunswick Records during the American Federation of Musicians strike, cataloguing the effect of the Harlem Renaissance on what was known as Dixieland, or "hot" jazz in New York City. The album features venues the orchestras played at the time of the recordings, such as Connie's Inn or The Cotton Club.

Reception
Harlem Jazz, 1930 was welcomed in Billboard magazine:
The spontaneous jazz of the early and turbulent '30s, in the speakeasy era when the New York Harlem sector jumped and Duke Ellington reigned supreme and most rhythmically at the Cotton Club, this package of eight sides represents still another chapter in the history of jazz... the selected sides bring back the memories of the reckless abandon in rhythm that characterized the playing of Don Redman at Connie's Inn, represented here in the Chant of the Weed theme and Shakin' the African, and stemming from the same Harlem hottery, Fletcher Henderson for Radio Rhythm and Just Blues. Completing the session is Luis Russell, then at the Saratoga Club, for Saratoga Swing and Case on Dawn.

According to Joel Whitburn, the only charting song of the set was Redman's "Chant Of The Weed", which peaked at number 15 in December 1931.

Track listing
These previously issued songs were featured on a 4-disc, 78 rpm album set, Brunswick Album No. B-1009.

Disc 1: (80035)

Disc 2: (80036)

Disc 3: (80037)

Disc 4: (80038)

References

1943 albums
Duke Ellington albums
Brunswick Records albums